Claudia Kogachi (born 1995) is a Japanese-born New Zealand artist. She was born in Awaji-shima, Japan, in 1995.

Kogachi is an Auckland-based artist whose work renders domestic scenes, adolescence and inter-generational cultural learning through various mediums. Members of her immediate family feature frequently in her works, as well as an exploration of her Japanese-Hawaiian heritage. Kogachi's 2020 work Obaachan during the lockdown, Wahiawā, Hawaiʻi was commissioned by Te Tuhi and developed with curator Abby Cunnane, and depicts a series of large tufted rugs depicting photographs Kogachi took while visiting her family in Hawai'i. Kogachi turned her art-making practice to rug tufting as a result of the COVID-19 pandemic's impact on her access to painting supplies.

Although born in Japan, Kogachi frequently visited her grandparents in Hawai'i who had moved there to work on the pineapple plantations. From the 1880s onwards, the pineapple industry brought many people from Japan seeking work, and many Japanese families settled permanently.

She graduated from Elam School of Fine Arts in 2017 with a BFA (Hons).

Process 
Speaking about making her tufted rugs, Kogachi has explained:The guns themselves weigh roughly 3 kgs, which doesn’t sound like much, but when you’re spending roughly 60+ hours on each large rug the toll this can take on your body is intense. I remember after finishing the last series, my right arm was visibly larger and in more pain than my left. The guns have so much range and have allowed me to experiment with new materials and dimension, however it does restrict movement which can affect the overall work.

Awards 
 2019 Winner NZPPA, New Zealand Painting and Printmaking Award
 2017 Gordon Harris Painting Award

Exhibitions 
 Everyone Has a Horse Phase, Sanderson Contemporary, Auckland, 2020
 Free Snacks at the Airport Lounge, Allpress Studio, Auckland, 2019
 Those are my f-ing shoes, Sanderson Contemporary, Auckland, 2019
 Like A Boss (group exhibition), Franklin Arts Centre, 2018
 Mother and Daughter on Hiatus, Sanderson Contemporary, Auckland, 2018
 You're not a Princess you know, Window Gallery, Auckland, 2018
 Mom, are we friends? Meanwhile, Gallery, Wellington, 2018
 Uncle Gigi, play_station Gallery, Wellington, 2020
New Artist Show 2020, Artspace Aotearoa, Auckland, 2020
It is what it is, Jhana Millers, Wellington, 2021
Rugged Heart, Visions Gallery, Auckland, 2021
Hot Girls with IBS, Hot Lunch [project space], Christchurch, 2021
When the Dust Settles, Artspace Aotearoa, Auckland, 2021

References 

Living people
1995 births
New Zealand women artists
People from Hyōgo Prefecture
Elam Art School alumni